Caraphlebia is an extinct genus of dragonflies, known from the Early Jurassic of Antarctica. It is one of the only named fossil insects from Antarctica that have been formally described; others include two beetles, Grahamelytron crofti and Ademosynoides antarctica, both from a Jurassic deposit on Mount Flora Formation. Caraphlebia is related to the genus Liassophlebia, but the hind wing has several weak antipodals in addition to the two strong, primary ones. In 2018, Caraphlebia was confirmed to be placed in the family Selenothemistidae in 2018.

See also

Odonata

References

Early Jurassic insects
Prehistoric Odonata genera
Extinct animals of Antarctica
Taxa named by Frank M. Carpenter